California's 52nd congressional district is a congressional district in the U.S. state of California.

The district currently includes south western portions of San Diego County. Cities in the district include National City, Chula Vista and most of Imperial Beach.

Competitiveness

In statewide races

Composition

As of the 2020 redistricting, California's 52nd congressional district is located in Southern California. It encompasses the South Bay region of San Diego County.

San Diego County is split between this district, the 50th district, the 51st district, and the 48th district. The 52nd and 48th are partitioned by San Miguel Rd, Proctor Valley Rd, Camino Mojave/Jonel Way, Highway 125, Upper Otay Reservoir, Otay Lakes Rd, Otay Valley Regional Park, Alta Rd, and Otay Mountain Truck Trail.

The 52nd and 50th are partitioned by Iowa St, University Ave, Inland Freeway, Escondido Freeway, Martin Luther King Jr Freeway, John J Montgomery Freeway, and San Diego Bay.

The 52nd and the 51st are partitioned by El Cajon Blvd, 58th St, Streamview Dr, College Ave, Meridian Ave, Lemarand Ave, Highway 94, Charlene Ave, 69th St, Imperial Ave, Larwood Rd, Taft St, Lincoln Pl, Glencoe Dr, Braddock St, Carlisle Dr, Carlsbad Ct/Osage Dr, Potrero St, Carlsbad St, Innsdale Ave, Worthington St/Innsdale Ln, Brady Ct/Innsdale Ln, Parkbrook Way/Alene St, Tinaja Ln/Bluffview Rd, Highway 54, Sweetwater Rd, and Bonita Rd.

The 52nd district takes in the cities of Chula Vista, National City, Imperial Beach, as well as the census-designated place Bonita. It also encompasses the San Diego neighborhoods of Paradise Hills, Logan Heights, Encanto, Mountain View, Barrio Logan, Shelltown, Lincoln Park, Nestor, Otay Mesa, and South San Diego.

Cities & CDP with 10,000 or more people
 San Diego - 1,386,932
 Chula Vista - 275,487
 National City - 61,394
 Imperial Beach - 27,440
 Bonita - 12,917

List of members representing the district

Election results

1992

1994

1996

1998

2000

2002

2004

2006

2008

2010

2012

2014

2016

2018

2020

2022

Historical district boundaries
From 2003 through 2013, the district consisted of many of San Diego's northern and eastern suburbs, including Lakeside, Poway, Ramona, La Mesa, and Spring Valley. Due to redistricting after the 2010 United States census, much of this area is now in the 50th district.

2003-13

2013-23

See also

List of United States congressional districts
United States congressional delegations from California

References

External links
 District information at GovTrack.us

52
Government of San Diego County, California
Government of San Diego
Coronado, California
Imperial Beach, California
La Jolla, San Diego
Ocean Beach, San Diego
Point Loma, San Diego
Poway, California
Constituencies established in 1993
1993 establishments in California